Akkar Governorate is the northernmost governorate of Lebanon. It comprises the single district of Akkar, which in turn is subdivided into 121 municipalities. The capital is at Halba. The governorate's western coastal plain constitutes Lebanon's second largest agricultural region after the Beqaa Valley, while the east features forested mountains that have been considered for protection as a national park.

The UNHCR estimated the population of the governorate at 389,899 in 2015, including 106,935 registered refugees of the Syrian Civil War and 19,404 Palestinian refugees. The population is predominantly Sunni Muslim around 70-75% with a minority of  Christian and Alawite communities and very few Shiites. Akkar is Lebanon's least urbanized governorate, with 80% of the population living in rural areas.

Akkar Governorate was created by the enactment of Law 522 on 16 July 2003, in which Akkar District was separated from North Governorate. Implementation of the new region only began in 2014 with the appointment of the first and current governor, Imad Labaki, and remains incomplete . Historically marginalized and neglected by the central government, Akkar is Lebanon's poorest region and has the country's highest illiteracy rate, and suffers from lack of basic infrastructure and services. The recent influx of Syrian refugees has exacerbated these problems, with the unemployment rate in the governorate reaching almost 60% in 2015.

References

 
Governorates of Lebanon
States and territories established in 2003
2003 establishments in Lebanon